The Tomb of the Unknown Soldier holds an unidentified member of the French armed forces killed during the First World War, to symbolically commemorate all soldiers who have died for France throughout history. It was installed in Paris under the Arc de Triomphe on 11 November 1920, simultaneously with the interment of a British unknown soldier in Westminster Abbey, making both graves the first examples of a tomb of the Unknown Soldier, and the first to honour the unknown dead of the First World War.

The burial site, surrounded by black metal posts linked together by chains, consists of a slab of granite from Vire on which is inscribed the epitaph: Ici repose un soldat français mort pour la Patrie, 1914–1918 ("Here rests a French soldier who died for the Fatherland, 1914–1918"). In 1923, an eternal flame was added, rekindled every day at 6:30 p.m. After World War II, a bronze shield embellished with a sword engulfed in flames, offered by the Allies to the glory of the French armies and in memory of the liberation of Paris, was installed at the foot of the tomb.

The expression Dalle sacrée ("Sacred slab"), popularized by General Weygand, is used by associations of veterans to designate the tomb and its flame. The monument is guarded on a permanent basis by a specialized unit of the National Police.

Context 
From the first year of the Great War, many projects to honour the dead were launched. Thus, the number of plaques and visitors' books began to increase. The honorary mention of Mort pour la France ("Died for France") was made into law on 2 July 1915, for those who died in combat.

In a speech at the Rennes Eastern Cemetery on 26 November 1916, François Simon, president of the local section of the Souvenir français (an association founded in 1887 to keep alive the memory of the dead of the Franco-Prussian War of 1870), first evoked the idea of opening the doors of the Panthéon to one of the ignored fighters who died bravely:

The idea did not really materialize until after the end of the conflict, but it first took the form of a guestbook remembering all the dead from the war: this book would be placed within the Pantheon. It went forward thanks to the press and, on 19 November 1918, the deputy of Eure-et-Loir, Maurice Maunoury, made a legal proposition for this idea. The Chamber of Deputies finally adopted, on 12 September 1919, the proposal to bury "a disadvantaged man who had died" in the Pantheon.

However, the location was later shifted to the current location instead of at the Pantheon. The law was adopted unanimously by the Chamber of Deputies and the Senate.

It was André Maginot, Minister of Pensions, himself a war cripple, who presided over the ceremony of choosing the soldier to be buried. It took place in one of the legendary places of the First World War: the citadel of Verdun.

Choosing the Unknown Soldier 

On 8 November 1920, Auguste Thin, a second-class soldier with the 132nd Infantry Regiment, then 21 years old, was tasked with identifying the unknown soldier who would rest under the triumphal arc. Auguste Thin would later be part of the Légion des Mille.

The bodies of eight soldiers who had served under French uniform but could not be identified were exhumed in the eight regions where the deadliest fighting had taken place: in Flanders, Artois, the Somme, Île-de-France, on the Chemin des Dames, the Champagne, at Verdun, and Lorraine. Initially, nine soldiers and nine sectors had been chosen, but in one of the sectors, none of the exhumed bodies offered the guarantee of being French.

On 8 November 1920, the eight oak coffins were transferred to the citadel of Verdun, and set on three catafalques, each guarded by two veterans. On the next day they were viewed by an estimated 8,000 visitors.

On 10 November, André Maginot, Minister of Pensions, approached one of the young soldiers carrying out his duties, Auguste Thin, who had been recruited as a volunteer in the class of 1919. Thin had distinguished himself by bravery, and his own father was a missing person.

Maginot handed Thin a bouquet of white and red carnations and explained the aim of his appointment: the coffin on which this young soldier placed the bouquet would be transferred to Paris and buried under the triumphal arch.

The whole event and the search for the soldier are recreated in Bertrand Tavernier's film La vie et rien d'autre (1989).

Burial 

On 10 November 1920, after the choice of the second-class soldier, Auguste Thin, was made, the coffin of the Unknown Soldier left Verdun immediately, under military escort. The body was transported by train to Paris at the Panthéon, where the President of the Republic, Alexandre Millerand, delivered an address. Safeguarded all night at Place Denfert-Rochereau, the coffin made a solemn entrance under the Arc de Triomphe on Armistice Day, 11 November 1920. It was placed on the gun carriage of a cannon 155, but was not buried until 28 January 1921, in the presence of civil and military authorities, including the marshals who distinguished themselves during the First World War (Ferdinand Foch, Joseph Joffre and Philippe Pétain). Also present were: Belgian Foreign Minister Henri Jaspar, British Prime Minister David Lloyd George, and a representative of Portugal. At 8:30 a.m., the troops presented their arms. The Minister of War, Louis Barthou, bowed before the coffin and delivered a statement: Au nom de la France pieusement reconnaissante et unanime, je salue le Soldat inconnu qui est mort pour elle ("In the name of France piously grateful and unanimous, I salute the Unknown Soldier who died for her").

The other seven bodies not chosen at the ceremony of 10 November 1920 now rest in the Faubourg-Pavé National Cemetery, near Verdun, in the Carré des sept inconnus ("Square of the Seven Unknowns").

The Eternal Flame

Symbolism 

The idea of burning a flame permanently was first put forward in early 1921 by the Ariège sculptor Grégoire Calvet. It was finally Augustin Beaud who initiated his installation in reference to the small lamp that illuminated the cemetery of Panossas, where he lived in his childhood, because he found the site austere with regard to the symbol that it represented. He next submitted the idea to General Henri Gouraud, military governor of Paris, and then to the municipal council, which approved it. Initially designed to be rekindled annually on 11 November, journalists Gabriel Boissy and Jacques Péricard proposed in October 1923 that it should be relit every day at 6:30 p.m. by veterans, an idea which was supported by public opinion. The plaque from which the flame arises was designed by architect Henri Favier – the muzzle of a cannon pointed towards the sky, embedded in the centre of a kind of rosette representing an inverted shield whose chiselled surface consists of swords forming a star – which was made by the artist and iron worker Edgar Brandt.

The sacred flame under the triumphal arch was lit for the first time at 6 p.m. on 11 November 1923 by André Maginot, who was then the Minister of War.

Rekindling ceremony 

The rekindling of the flame at the Tomb of the Unknown Soldier has taken place at 6:30 every evening since 1923. This is performed by one of the veterans' associations.

Founded in 1925 and declared on 16 October 1930, the association La Flamme sous l'Arc de Triomphe ("The Flame under the Arc de Triomphe") designated General Gouraud, a war-maimed military governor of Paris, as its first president; he held this position until his death in 1946.

In 2022, Lieutenant General Christophe de Saint-Chamas, Governor of Les Invalides, succeeded Bruno Dary as head of the Comité de la Flamme ("Flame Committee"), overseeing the daily rekindling of the flame.

Linked events 
On 23 August 1927, the execution of the anarchists Sacco and Vanzetti provoked riots in France, Japan, and South Africa. In Paris, the tomb was desecrated during the riot; this event was at the origin of the creation of the Croix-de-Feu (Cross of Fire) Political Party.

On 26 August 1970, a dozen women belonging to the Women's Liberation Movement laid a wreath under the Arc de Triomphe with the inscription: À la femme du Soldat inconnu ("To the wife of the Unknown Soldier"). Some of the banners displayed on that day had the slogan: Il y a plus inconnu que le soldat inconnu : sa femme ("There is more unknown than the unknown soldier: his wife"). This was the first media action of the movement.

In other countries 
The idea of a symbolic Tomb of the Unknown Soldier has spread to other countries. In 1921, the United States unveiled its own Tomb of the Unknown Soldier, Portugal its Túmulo do Soldado Desconhecido, and Italy its La tomba del Milite Ignoto. Many other nations have also followed the practice and created their own tombs.

See also 

 Tomb of the Unknown Soldier – a listing of unknown soldier memorials around the world
 Sonnerie aux morts

Notes

References

Bibliography

Further reading 

 
 

 

 "Notice nécrologique". La Voix du Bois des Caures (in French) (26th and 27th edition). 1 & 15 December 1928.

Filmography 

 La vie et rien d'autre (Life and Nothing But), a film by Bertrand Tavernier (1989) mentions the story of the choice of the Unknown Soldier in November 1920 (the order given to bury an anonymous soldier at the ceremony of choice among the eight coffins). The scene of the selection of the coffin has been reconstructed identically, dialogues included. Only one error should be noted; the bell ringing for the dead dates from 1931.

External links 
 Official website of the association La Flamme sous l'Arc de Triomphe 
 Qui est le soldat inconnu? GEO magazine 

Arc de Triomphe
1920 establishments in France
Allegorical sculptures in France
Cultural infrastructure completed in 1920
World War I memorials in France
French Third Republic
Monuments and memorials in Paris
Sculptures in Paris
Tourist attractions in Paris
Tombs of Unknown Soldiers